Peter Stanley Fisher (born 19 September 1936) is a former Australian politician. Born in Rainbow, Victoria, he attended Longerenong Agricultural College before becoming a farmer. In 1972, he was elected to the Australian House of Representatives as the Country Party member for Mallee. During his parliamentary career, Fisher served as Deputy Whip (1976-1980), Chief Whip (1980-1983) and Shadow Minister for Sport and Recreation (1983-1984). Fisher held the seat until 1993 (by which time his party had become the National Party). In 1979, the first Qantas Boeing 747 aircraft equipped with Rolls-Royce engines (registration VH-ECB) was named the 'City of Swan Hill' after the riverside Mallee town as a result of Fisher's lobbying efforts.

After leaving Parliament, Fisher was appointed as Chief Commissioner of Horsham Rural City Council as part of the Kennett/MacNamara Government's restructuring of local government in Victoria. He also served as Trustee of Horsham Regional Art Gallery from 1998 to 2009, thereafter relocating to Buderim to retire closer to his family.

References

National Party of Australia members of the Parliament of Australia
Members of the Australian House of Representatives for Mallee
Members of the Australian House of Representatives
1936 births
Living people
20th-century Australian politicians